Moxa may refer to:

 Moxa, material used in moxibustion, a Chinese traditional medicine
 Mihail Moxa (1550–1650), Romanian historiographer and translator
 Moxa, Thuringia, Germany, municipality
 Moxa Technologies, Taiwanese company